Walter Gilbert (born 1932) is an American scientist and Nobel laureate.

Walter Gilbert may also refer to:

Walter Gilbert (American football) (1915–1979), American football player
Walter Gilbert (pilot) (born 1899), Canadian aviator
Walter Gilbert (sculptor) (1871–1946), English sculptor
Sir Walter Gilbert, 1st Baronet (1785–1853), British East India Company Army officer
Walter Gilbert (cricketer) (1853–1924), English cricketer
Wally Gilbert, American athlete in baseball, football and basketball
Walter fitz Gilbert of Cadzow, Scottish nobleman

See also
Walter G. Alexander (Walter Gilbert Alexander, 1880–1953), American physician and politician
Walter Dinsdale (Walter Gilbert Dinsdale, 1916–1982), Canadian politician